Agym (Stream in English) is a Kyrgyz language biweekly newspaper published in Kyrgyzstan. It is privately owned.

History and profile
Agym, a Kyrgyz language biweekly paper, was established in 2001. The paper is published on Fridays. Bakyt Jamalidinov was the publisher at the initial period. Melis Eshimkanov was the owner of the biweekly. He also served as the editor-in-chief of Agym. Then Begaly Nargozuev became the publisher and owner. The paper was sold to Alexander Kim in February 2009.

As of 2007 Agym was an opposition paper in the country. It has an independent political leaning.

In 2009, the approximate circulation of Agym was 10,000 copies. It rose to 15,000 copies in 2011.

See also
 List of newspapers in Kyrgyzstan

References

2001 establishments in Kyrgyzstan
Publications established in 2001
Newspapers published in Kyrgyzstan
Kyrgyz-language newspapers
Biweekly newspapers